The 9th Missouri State Militia Cavalry Regiment, was a cavalry regiment that served as an element of the Union Army in the state of Missouri during the American Civil War. Unlike Militia units in other states, the 9th Missouri State Militia Cavalry was a full-time military unit, permanently engaged in internal counter-insurgency and protection of the state of Missouri from invasion by conventional Confederate units. The regiment was equipped and paid by the Federal government and was integrated into the Federal military structure in the Department of Missouri. The 9th MSM Cavalry was one of Missouri's most successful counter-guerrilla  units.

Service
The 9th Missouri State Militia Cavalry Regiment was raised by Colonel Odon Guitar, a successful lawyer and member of the Missouri General Assembly from Columbia, Missouri.

Organized at large in Missouri February 12, 1862. to September 20, 1863. Attached to District of Rolla, Dept. of Missouri, to February, 1863. District of North Missouri, Dept. of Missouri, to July, 1865.

Mustered out July 13, 1865.

Casualties
Regiment lost during service 2 Officers and 29 Enlisted men killed and mortally wounded and 1 Officer and 76 Enlisted men by disease. Total 108.

Commanders
Brigadier General Odon Guitar, Missouri State Militia

See also

 Missouri Civil War Union units
 Missouri in the Civil War

References

 Dyer, Frederick H. A Compendium of the War of the Rebellion (Des Moines, IA:  Dyer Pub. Co.), 1908.

External links
 Article dealing the organization of 9th MSM Cavalry
 Article dealing with Colonel Odon Guitar, commander of the 9th MSM Cavalry

Military units and formations established in 1862
1861 establishments in Missouri
Military units and formations disestablished in 1865
Units and formations of the Union Army from Missouri